The Cortaca Jug is the trophy given to the annual college football game played between the Red Dragons of the State University of New York College at Cortland and the Bombers of Ithaca College. The match-up is one of the most prominent in NCAA Division III football. The Cortaca game typically sells out, with thousands of fans packed into the stadium.

In 2019, the game set a Division III attendance record when it was held at MetLife Stadium. The 2022 matchup was played at Yankee Stadium and was the second all-time attendance record of Division III football.

History of the game
The name is a portmanteau of the names of the two schools, the "cort" coming from SUNY Cortland and the "aca" part coming from Ithaca College. The schools are located 21 miles apart in the eastern end of the Finger Lakes region of New York. The schools have rich football histories. Ithaca has won three NCAA Division III Football Championships and Cortland has nine playoff and 15 bowl game appearances since 1988.

The night before the Jug, it is customary for the staff of Cortland's radio station WSUC to play the staff of Ithaca's radio station 92 WICB in a game called "The Cortaca Mic" which takes place at Cortland.

Since 2006, Ithaca College students and alumni residing in Los Angeles have gathered to watch the game in an event dubbed CortaCal. The event originally began in an apartment in Sherman Oaks, California. It was held from 2008 to 2010 at The Casting Office in Studio City, California, and since 2011 has been held at its current home, 33 Taps (formerly Dillon's Irish Pub) in Hollywood, California. Between 300 and 400 Ithaca College alumni attend every year.

Ithaca College alumni in New York City have begun watching the game at their own annual event, NYCortaca. The event was started in 2009 by Ithaca alumni living in NYC and was first held at George Keeley Pub on the Upper West Side. In 2010, it was held at Berry Park in Williamsburg, Brooklyn, and in 2011 it took place at Irving Plaza in Union Square. NYCortaca 2012 was held at Brooklyn Bowl in Williamsburg, and in 2013 NYCortaca returned to Irving Plaza. NYCortaca 2013 was attended by over 800 Cortaca fans and was the biggest off-campus alumni gathering in Ithaca College history.

More localized Cortland and Ithaca graduates come together to attend the game, or showings of it at the Lynne Parks Hoffmann Alumni House, in Cortland, NY. Examples include an annual gathering from Slabtown, NY.

In 2019, the game was held at MetLife Stadium in the New York City area, as part of commemorations of the 150th anniversary of college football. The game had an attendance of 45,161, the highest in NCAA Division III history.

On November 12, 2022, the game was played at Yankee Stadium in The Bronx.

History of the trophy

The Cortaca Jug was introduced to the already competitive rivalry in 1959 by the captains of the two teams. While driving in nearby Homer in 1959, Cortland football captain Tom Decker stopped at a yard sale and purchased a $2 jug from a local farmer, named Freddy Testa, that he thought could be used as a trophy during the annual game between the two teams. After meeting up with friend and Ithaca football captain Dick Carmean, the two painted the jug blue, gold, red, and white in honor of both schools’ colors. The first Jug ran out of room for scores in the mid-1980s, necessitating a second Jug that sports the most recent results. After 2015, Jug II was also full.

2013 riot
The Cortaca Jug is usually associated with an assortment of pre- and post-game parties and drinking. Following their 2013 win, SUNY Cortland revelers rioted on the streets of Cortland, throwing beer and other items, flipping cars, and committing other destructive acts that resulted in the arrests of around 30 people. New York State police assisted the crowd control, and a "command post" was set up at the local fire station. SUNY Cortland President Erik J. Bitterbaum issued a formal apology for the students' behavior.

In 2017, Students in SUNY Cortland's Student Government Association started a campaign to "Take Back Cortaca", partnering with Mayor Brian Tobin and local authorities to change the outlook on the college after the riot. Their campaign centered around community service initiatives before and after the game.

Game results

Ithaca leads the overall series 41–33–3 and the Cortaca Jug series 37–24.

#Quarterfinal playoff game. Does not count in Cortaca Jug game count.

See also 
 List of NCAA college football rivalry games

References

External links
 Cortaca Jug Game
 The Cortaca Jug on Facebook
 Cortaca Jug information from SUNY Cortland
 Ithaca College football history

College football rivalry trophies in the United States
Ithaca Bombers football
Cortland Red Dragons football